Marolles-en-Brie (literally Marolles in Brie) is a commune in the Val-de-Marne department, in the southeastern suburbs of Paris, France.

Transport
Marolles-en-Brie is served by no station of the Paris Métro, RER, or suburban rail network. The closest station to Marolles-en-Brie is Boissy-Saint-Léger station on Paris RER line A. This station is located in the neighboring commune of Boissy-Saint-Léger,  from the town center of Marolles-en-Brie. There is a line ( the line 4012 ) of buses which links the Boissy Saint-Léger's RER station and Marolles-en-Brie.

Population

Education
The primary schools in the commune are École maternelle des Buissons (preschool/nursery school), École élémentaire des Buissons, and École maternelle et élémentaire de la Forêt (combined preschool and elementary). Students may attend Collège Georges Brassens (junior high school) in Santeny and Lycée Guillaume Budé in Limeil-Brévannes.

See also
Communes of the Val-de-Marne department
Church of Saint-Julien-de-Brioude, Marolles-en-Brie

References

External links

 Home page 

Communes of Val-de-Marne